Somwar Peth is the name of a district, in the Marathi language, in a number of Indian cities. These include cities like Pune, Solapur, Madhavnagar, Karad, Ahmednagar etc. The term Somwar has derived from the day Monday in Marathi.

Neighbourhoods in Maharashtra